Pikker was an Estonian magazine of satire and humor published between 1943 and 2001, named for the Estonian lightning god Pikker.

During 1943–1944 Pikker existed as satire and humor supplement to the Soviet Estonian newspaper  Rahva Hääl and printed in Moscow and Leningrad. In 1945 its editorial office was moved to Tallinn, Estonian SSR. In 1973 Pikker published two articles which criticised the planned economy which were censored by the authorities soon after the publication. In 1987, on April Fools' Day the magazine issued a humor award, Meie Mats.

References

1943 establishments in the Soviet Union
2001 disestablishments in Estonia
Defunct magazines published in Estonia
Magazines published in the Soviet Union
Eastern Bloc mass media
Estonian-language magazines
Estonian humour
Magazines established in 1943
Magazines disestablished in 2001
Mass media in Tallinn
Newspaper supplements
Satirical magazines published in Europe
Magazines published in Moscow
Censorship in the Soviet Union